In enzymology, a peptide deformylase is an enzyme that catalyzes the chemical reaction

H2O + formyl-L-methionyl peptide  methionyl peptide + formate

Thus, the two substrates of this enzyme are formyl-L-methionyl peptide and H2O, whereas its two products are formate and methionyl peptide.

This enzyme belongs to the family of hydrolases, those acting on carbon-nitrogen bonds other than peptide bonds, specifically in linear amides.  The systematic name of this enzyme class is formyl-L-methionyl peptide amidohydrolase.

Structural studies

See also
Actinonin

References

 
 
 
 
 
 
 
 
 
 
 
 

EC 3.5.1
Enzymes of known structure